Bill Wyman's Rhythm Kings are an English blues rock band founded and led by bassist Bill Wyman of the Rolling Stones. Other personnel have varied depending on availability, an arrangement described in The Telegraph as "a fluctuating squad of veterans". Their concerts and albums tend to emphasize cover songs of blues, R&B and early rock and roll hits from the 1950s. Wyman formed the Rhythm Kings after leaving the Rolling Stones in 1993 following their worldwide tour in support of Steel Wheels and a short hiatus from the music industry, citing a desire to work in smaller clubs and avoid the pressure of being in one of the most successful rock bands in the world. 

On 10 December 2007, Wyman and his band appeared alongside a reunited Led Zeppelin at the Ahmet Ertegun Tribute Concert at the O2 in London.

In 2009, ex-Rolling Stones guitarist Mick Taylor was invited as a guest performer with Wyman's Rhythm Kings.

Discography
Studio albums
 Struttin' Our Stuff (October 1997)
 Anyway the Wind Blows (February 1999)
 Groovin' (May 2000)
 Double Bill (May 2001)
 Just for a Thrill (May 2004)
 Studio Time (April 2018)

Live albums
 Rhythm Kings Live (November 2005)
 Live Communication (September 2011)

Singles
 "Groovin'" / "Can't Get My Rest at Night" / "Gambler's Lament" (2000)
 "That's How Heartaches Are Made" / "I Know (You Don't Love Me No More)" (2004)

Video albums
 Bill Wyman's Rhythm Kings in Concert (2002)
 Bill Wyman's Rhythm Kings - Let the good times roll (2004)

Featured musicians

Touring members
Bill Wyman bass guitar and vocals
Gary Brooker keyboards and vocals
Georgie Fame keyboards and vocals
Mike Sanchez keyboards and vocals
Beverly Skeete vocals
Janice Hoyte vocals
Eddie Floyd vocals
Graham Broad drums
Albert Lee guitar and vocals
Andy Fairweather-Low guitar and vocals
Martin Taylor guitar
Terry Taylor guitar and vocals
Nick Payn saxophone
Frank Mead saxophone
Geraint Watkins keyboards and vocals
Gary U.S. Bonds vocals

Studio guests
Paul Carrack vocals
Eric Clapton guitar
Tommy Emmanuel guitar
Peter Frampton guitar
George Harrison guitar
Mark Knopfler guitar
Mick Taylor guitar
Odetta vocals
Anita Kelsey backing vocals
Nicky Hopkins piano
Chris Stainton keyboards
Max Middleton keyboards
Ringo Starr drums
Ray Cooper percussion
Axel Zwingenberger piano

See also
Ringo Starr & His All Starr Band
World Classic Rockers

References

External links
 Bill Wyman's Rhythm Kings Official Site

English blues rock musical groups
Musical collectives
Musical groups established in 1997
Musical groups from London
The Rolling Stones